Sir Richard Stuart Lake,  (July 10, 1860 – April 23, 1950) was an English-born Canadian territorial provincial and federal level politician from Saskatchewan, Canada.

Territorial politics
Born in Preston, Lancashire, England, Lake was elected to the Legislative Assembly of the North-West Territories for the Grenfell district in the 1898 Northwest Territories general election. In 1900 he vacated his seat to run in Assiniboia East in the 1900 Canadian federal election.

After being defeated in his first attempt at federal politics he ran for his old seat and was re-elected as the MLA in a by-election on March 22, 1901.

Lake was acclaimed to his second term in office in the 1902 Northwest Territories general election. He held that post until the 1904 Canadian federal election when he vacated his seat to make a second run at Federal politics.

Federal politics

Lake was elected as a Member of the House of Commons of Canada in his second run at Federal politics in the 1904 Canadian federal election in the new Qu'Appelle federal electoral district.

He was re-elected to a second term in the 1908 Canadian federal election winning a hotly contested election by just a 100 votes.

In the 1911 Canadian federal election he was defeated by Liberal Levi Thomson and never returned to federal politics.

Lieutenant-Governor of Saskatchewan
After being defeated in the Federal election, Lake went to work for the Saskatchewan Public Service Commission, he held that job until he was appointed as the third Lieutenant-Governor of Saskatchewan on October 18, 1915. He served for six years, until February 17, 1921, when he was offered the possibility of extending his royal commission; however, he refused.

Late life
He moved to Victoria, British Columbia after his career in politics and lived the rest of his life there.

He and his wife, Dorothy, were aboard the SS Athenia when it was torpedoed on September 3, 1939 and survived.

He died on April 23, 1950.

Electoral record

External links
 Archives of the Northwest Territories Legislature 1876 - 1905

Biography Richard Stuart Lake Saskatchewan Encyclopedia

1860 births
1950 deaths
Canadian Knights Commander of the Order of St Michael and St George
Members of the Legislative Assembly of the Northwest Territories
Conservative Party of Canada (1867–1942) MPs
Members of the House of Commons of Canada from Saskatchewan
Members of the House of Commons of Canada from the Northwest Territories
Lieutenant Governors of Saskatchewan
Pre-Confederation Saskatchewan people